Cloé Korman (born 1983 in Paris) is a French writer.

Cloé Korman studied Anglo-Saxon literature before settling for two years in New York. During trips in 2005, she discovered the west coast of the United States and Mexico that inspired her first novel  (2010) which earned her the Inter Book Prize and the Prix Littéraire Valery Larbaud.

Work 
 2010: Les Hommes-couleurs, éditions du Seuil 
 2013: Les Saisons de Louveplaine, Seuil, series "Cadre rouge",

References

External links 
 Cloé Korman - Les saisons de Louveplaine on YouTube
 Les Hommes-couleurs, Cloé Korman on Éditions du Seuil
 Cloé Korman on France Culture
 Cloé Korman, lauréate du Livre Inter 2010 pour "Les Hommes-couleurs" on Le Point

21st-century French novelists
Prix Valery Larbaud winners
Prix du Livre Inter winners
Writers from Paris
Living people
1983 births
21st-century French women writers